Elmidae, commonly known as riffle beetles, is a family of beetles in the superfamily Byrrhoidea described by John Curtis in 1830. Both adults and larvae are usually aquatic, living under rocks in fast-flowing shallow areas of streams, such as riffles, feeding on algae and biofilms. There are more than 150 genera and 1,500 described species in Elmidae. The oldest record of the group is Cretohypsilara from the Cenomanian aged Burmese amber.

See also
 List of Elmidae genera

References

Further reading

External links

 

 
Polyphaga families